Marcello Lante della Rovere (1561 – 19 April 1652) was an Italian people Catholic Cardinal appointed Dean and Camerlengo of the College of Cardinals.


Family and early life

Lante was born 1561, the son of Ludovico Lante of the Dukes Della Rovere and M. Lavinia Maffei. His sister was married to Pope Paul V's brother and his nephew was Ippolito Lante Montefeltro della Rovere who became Duke of Bomarzo

As a young man he was named cleric and then auditor-general of the Apostolic Chamber of Pope Clement VIII.

Ecclesiastic career

He was elevated to Cardinal on 11 September 1606 and installed as Cardinal-Priest at the church of Santi Quirico e Giulitta. In December of that same year he was elected Bishop of Todi where he served for until 1625. On 14 Jan 1607, he was consecrated bishop by Pope Paul V with Ottavio Paravicini, Cardinal-Priest of Sant'Alessio, and Carlo Conti, Bishop of Ancona e Numana, serving as co-consecrators.

Participated in the Papal conclave of 1621 and then the conclave of 1623 which elected Pope Urban VIII. During Urban's pontificate he was appointed to a number of Church administrative positions including Camerlengo of the Sacred College of Cardinals (1625 to 1626) before being appointed Dean of the College of Cardinals in time to preside over the conclave of 1644 which elected Urban's successor, Pope Innocent X.

For a year, in 1629, he served at Cardinal-Bishop of Palestrina and later that year he was appointed Bishop of Frascati and served for 10 years until being appointed Bishop of Porto e Santa Rufina in 1639.

Lante died on 18 April 1652 and was buried at the San Nicola da Tolentino agli Orti Sallustiani.

Episcopal succession

References and notes

1561 births
1652 deaths
17th-century Italian cardinals
Cardinal-bishops of Palestrina
Della Rovere family